Mountain Longleaf National Wildlife Refuge is a  National Wildlife Refuge located in eastern Alabama, near Anniston, Alabama on the former site of Fort McClellan. It takes its name from some of the last remaining mountain longleaf pine (Pinus palustris) forests in the southeastern United States.

Approximately 3,000 acres (12 km2) of the refuge is open to the public during daylight hours. The remaining 6,000 acres (24 km2) will open after the clean-up of environmental contaminants has been completed. The facility has a small two person staff with a $250,000 annual budget. Plans call for a budget of approximately $900,000 with a ten-person staff. Mountain Longleaf NWR also administers the Cahaba River National Wildlife Refuge & Watercress Darter National Wildlife Refuge.

Topography
Mountain Longleaf NWR is located on the former military training lands of Fort McClellan. The mountains of the refuge, Choccolocco and the Talladega Mountains, are in the southernmost portions of the Appalachian Mountains.

Wildlife and protected species
Mountain Longleaf serves as a home to several endangered species including the red-cockaded woodpecker and the gray bat. Cougars have also been sighted in the area.

Other than the mountain longleaf pine, other plant species warranting special attention include the  white-fringeless orchid, an endangered species candidate, as well as 11 species of flora and 21 species of fauna which are considered rare.

Facilities

Mountain Longleaf is a relatively new wildlife refuge and, as such, has not yet developed any sizable tourist facilities. A single information kiosk is located at the junction of Bain's Gap Road and Ridge Road South. Additionally, part of the reserve is closed to the general public, pending environmental cleanup. Otherwise, there are limited opportunities for hiking, photography, and wildlife observation at the refuge.

See also
 List of National Wildlife Refuges

References

External links
 Mountain Longleaf National Wildlife Refuge homepage

National Wildlife Refuges in Alabama
Anniston, Alabama
Protected areas of Calhoun County, Alabama
Protected areas established in 2003
2003 establishments in Alabama